USS Stephen R. Jones (ID-4526) was a cargo ship that served in the United States Navy from 1918 to 1919.

SS Stephen R. Jones was built in 1915 as a commercial collier at Newport News, Virginia, by Newport News Shipbuilding and Drydock Company, and was delivered to her owners, the Crowell and Thurlow Steamship Company of Boston, Massachusetts, on 11 November 1915. The U.S. Navy acquired her on 3 May 1918 at Philadelphia, Pennsylvania, for World War I service as a cargo ship and commissioned her the same day as USS Stephen R. Jones.

Assigned to the Naval Overseas Transportation Service, Stephen R. Jones was immediately refitted for naval service, loaded with a cargo of United States Army supplies, and ordered to Norfolk, Virginia. She joined a convoy at Hampton Roads, Virginia, and departed for France on 18 May 1918. She arrived at Brest, France, on 5 June 1918 but, due to the congestion of shipping there, was routed to Bordeaux, France, to off-load her cargo. She then returned to the United States, arriving at Philadelphia on 10 July 1918.

Loading another cargo of U.S. Army supplies, Stephen R. Jones again set out for France, arriving at St. Nazaire on 18 August 1918. After unloading, she moved to Le Verdon-sur-Mer, France, for ballast. She departed Le Verdon-sur-Mer with a convoy bound for Philadelphia on 25 August 1918.

Stephen R. Jones made two more round trips to France, arriving at Philadelphia at the end of the final one on 3 March 1919. From Philadelphia, she was routed to Virginia where, on 8 March 1919, she was decommissioned and returned to the Crowell and Thurlow Steamship Company at Newport News.

Once again SS Stephen R. Jones, she returned to commercial service, remaining in mercantile use until she was wrecked in the Cape Cod Canal on 28 June 1942.

Although, like most commercial ships commissioned into the U.S. Navy during World War I, Stephen R. Jones received a naval registry Identification Number (Id. No.) -- in her case Id. No. 4526—she appears to have had it assigned retroactively, years after her Navy service.

References

Department of the Navy: Naval Historical Center Online Library of Selected Images:  Civilian Ships: S.S. Stephen R. Jones (American Collier, 1915) Served as USS Stephen R. Jones (ID # 4526) in 1918-1919.
NavSource Online: Section Patrol Craft Photo Archive: Stephen R. Jones (ID 4526)

World War I cargo ships of the United States
Ships built in Newport News, Virginia
1915 ships
Cargo ships of the United States Navy
Cape Cod Canal